Grant Roy Nel (born 7 April 1988) is an Australian Olympic  diver. He is the 2016 National Champion for Men's 3 m and was a medalist for Australia at the 2010 and 2014 Commonwealth Games.

References
Profile - Nel - Diving Australia
Commonwealth Games: Matthew Mitcham wins silver medal in 1m springboard, Grant Nel takes bronze

External links
 
 
 
 
 
 
 
 

1988 births
Living people
Australian male divers
Olympic divers of Australia
Divers at the 2016 Summer Olympics
Commonwealth Games medallists in diving
Commonwealth Games silver medallists for Australia
Commonwealth Games bronze medallists for Australia
Divers at the 2010 Commonwealth Games
Divers at the 2014 Commonwealth Games
Medallists at the 2010 Commonwealth Games
Medallists at the 2014 Commonwealth Games